William Frederick Dundon (March 16, 1934 – January 5, 2011) was an American bobsledder. He competed in the four-man event at the 1964 Winter Olympics.

References

1934 births
2011 deaths
American male bobsledders
Olympic bobsledders of the United States
Bobsledders at the 1964 Winter Olympics
Sportspeople from Watertown, New York